The Humanz Tour was a concert tour by the British alternative rock virtual band Gorillaz, in support of their fifth studio album Humanz.

Personnel
Damon Albarn – lead vocals, keyboards, piano, acoustic guitar, electric guitar, melodica, keytar
Mike Smith – keyboards, backing vocals
Jeff Wootton – lead guitar
Seye Adelekan – bass guitar, ukulele, acoustic guitar, backing vocals
Gabriel Wallace – drums, percussion
Jesse Hackett – keyboards
Karl Vanden Bossche – drums, percussion
Angel Silvera – backing vocals
Petra Luke – backing vocals, vocals on "Dare"
Rebecca Freckleton – backing vocals, vocals on "Dare"
Michelle Ndegwa – backing vocals, vocals on "Out of Body" and "Kids with Guns"
Matthew Allen – backing vocals
Marcus Anthony Johnson – backing vocals (Select dates only)
Adeleye Omotayo – backing vocals (Select dates only)
Demon Strings – strings (Birmingham and London shows only)

Guest collaborators and additional musicians
Jamie Principle – vocals on "Sex Murder Party" and "Hollywood" (Select dates only)
Peven Everett – vocals on "Strobelite" and "Stylo" (Select dates only)
Vince Staples – vocals on "Ascension" and "Clint Eastwood" (Select dates only)
Zebra Katz – vocals on "Sex Murder Party" and "Out of Body" (Select dates only)
Kilo Kish – vocals on "19-2000" and "Out of Body" (Select dates only)
Little Simz – vocals on "Garage Palace", "We Got the Power" and "Clint Eastwood" (Select dates only)
Anthony Hamilton – vocals on "Carnival" (Chicago and first San Francisco show only)
Hypnotic Brass Ensemble – brass on "Broken" and "Sweepstakes" (Chicago and London shows only)
Pusha T – vocals on "Let Me Out" (Select dates only)
Del the Funky Homosapien – vocals on "Clint Eastwood" (Select dates only)
De La Soul – vocals on "Momentz", "Superfast Jellyfish" and "Feel Good Inc." (Select dates only)
Bootie Brown – vocals on "Dirty Harry" and "Stylo" (Select dates only)
Carly Simon – vocals on "Ticker Tape" (Boston only)
Kali Uchis – vocals on "She's My Collar" (Select dates only)
Kelela – vocals on "Busted and Blue" and "Submission" (Quebec City only)
Danny Brown – rap on "Submission" (Select dates only)
Yukimi Nagano – vocals on "Empire Ants" (First San Francisco show only)
DRAM – vocals on "Andromeda" and "We Got the Power" (Select dates only)
Jehnny Beth – vocals on "We Got the Power" (Select dates only)
Mos Def – vocals on "Stylo" and "Sweepstakes" (New York City and London shows only)
Eslam Jawaad – vocals on "Clint Eastwood" (Dubai only)
Malikah Lynn – vocals on "Clint Eastwood" (Dubai only)
Faia Younan – vocals on "Busted and Blue" (Dubai only)
Popcaan – vocals on "Saturnz Barz" (Paris shows only)
Pauline Black – vocals on "Charger" - Alternate version (Select dates only)
Gruff Rhys – vocals and guitar on "Superfast Jellyfish" (London shows only)
Noel Gallagher – vocals and guitar on "We Got the Power" (London shows only)
Graham Coxon – guitar on "We Got the Power" (London shows only) 
Roses Gabor – vocals on "Dare" (London shows only)
Shaun Ryder – vocals on "Dare" (London shows only)

Visuals
Described as "a totally immersive interactive experience with the audience" by frontman Damon Albarn, the Humanz Tour utilized a large screen behind the band to project music videos and visuals alongside live music, much like the band's previous tours. Humanz collaborators who were unable to present themselves for the concerts were represented by pre-recorded video, a technique previously utilized in Demon Days Live. The set and production for the tour was designed by London-based design studio Block9.

Set list
The following setlist is obtained from the concert held at the Huntington Bank Pavilion in Chicago, on 8 July 2017. It is not a representation of all shows on the tour.

Songs performed

Tour dates

Notes

Box office score data

References

Gorillaz concert tours
2017 concert tours
2018 concert tours